This list is of the Cultural Properties of Japan designated in the category of  for the Prefecture of Saga.

National Cultural Properties
As of 1 March 2015, thirteen Important Cultural Properties with sixteen component structures have been designated, being of national significance.

Prefectural Cultural Properties
As of 1 October 2014, nineteen properties with twenty-one component structures have been designated at a prefectural level.

Municipal Cultural Properties
As of 1 May 2014, one hundred and two properties have been designated at a municipal level.

Registered Cultural Properties
As of 1 March 2015, ninety-four properties at thirty-five sites have been registered (as opposed to designated) at a national level.

See also
 Cultural Properties of Japan
 National Treasures of Japan
 List of Historic Sites of Japan (Saga)

References

External links
  Cultural Properties in Saga Prefecture

Cultural Properties,Saga
Buildings and structures in Saga Prefecture
Saga
Structures,Saga